Pipal is a village development committee in Western Rukum District in Karnali Province of western Nepal. At the time of the 2011 Nepal census it had a population of 4111 people living in 846 individual households.

References

Populated places in Western Rukum District